Robert "Musa" Cerantonio is a former ISIS propagandist  who has been called perhaps "the most famous jihadist in Australia". Cerantonio   converted to Islam in 2002, he became an Islamic preacher a few years later, then a supporter of the restoration of the caliphate, and of the Islamic State. He has been arrested and deported once, and is currently serving a prison sentence for trying to travel by boat from Australia to ISIS territory in the southern Philippines due for release in May 2023. 

Cerantonio was born into an Italian-Irish Catholic family in Footscray, Australia, and converted to Islam at the age of 17. In early 2022, while engaged in close study of the Quran, he came to the conclusion that the Quran "was not divinely inspired" after studying its discussion of Dhu al-Qarnayn. A few days before the month of Ramadan started, Musa left Islam.

Early life
Cerantonio was born on 28 January 1985 in West Footscray, Melbourne, Australia to a Catholic family of six. He is of Italian and Irish heritage.

He has described his upbringing as nominally Catholic. "We weren’t very practising, and whilst we were Catholic by name, we didn’t go to church except on Christmas or Easter, or when someone died or was getting married," he said.

He attended a Catholic primary school, and Footscray City College for secondary education. The City College had an informal atmosphere and was "a very liberal school, influenced by the politics of socialism," according to Cerantonio.

In 2000, at 15, he visited the Vatican "to strengthen his Christian faith". Instead of becoming firmer in his belief, "I began to question the role of the Pope in the Catholic Church…and saw people praying to a dead body. There was idol worship at the home of my faith…and I felt in my heart that this was not right."

Cerantonio has two children from a marriage to "an Australian of Lebanese descent."

Conversion to Islam
In 2002, during the month of Ramadan and at age 17, Cerantonio converted to Islam. It came after two years of reading about Islam. After converting to Islam, Cerantonio joined Tablighi Jamaat. In 2005, he visited Medina in Saudi Arabia.

Cerantonio later enrolled at Victoria University, Australia where he studied communications and history. While at the university he was President of the Islamic Society.

Islamic activism

Early activity
He engaged in activism and preaching. In 2006, Cerantonio performed his first Hajj. As a convert to Islam he lectured at conferences in Australia, Italy, Germany, the Netherlands, India, Kuwait, Qatar, the UAE and the Philippines. He has authored dozens of articles on Islam.

In 2010, Cerantonio traveled to the Middle East to raise funds for a Melbourne community centre to be run by the Islamic Information and Services Network of Australasia (IISNA). He had previously attended IISNA camps. After the trip, Cerantonio began receiving regular visits by ASIO (Australian Security Intelligence Organisation).

In 2011, Cerantonio was invited to Cairo Egypt to become a televangelist by the Saudi-backed Iqraa satellite network. He presented the shows "Ask the Sheikh" and "Our Legacy". His TV presentations became "increasingly political" as he gravitated toward advocating "the establishment of a caliphate controlled by a single absolute leader and run strictly according to Sharia. He was fired from Iqraa for refusal to abandon preaching for the revival of the caliphate, beaten by Iqraa station staff, and left Egypt in 2012.

Philippines 2012-June 2014
Accord to journalist Graeme Wood who interviewed Cerantonio extensively, Cerantonio's passion to establish the caliphate led him to the southern Philippines in 2013, where support for the caliphate was allegedly strong, and so it might be possible to establish a caliphate.

Cerantonio fled to the Philippines under the pretext of visiting his brother. His brother was in Manila, but he traveled to Mindanao. While there, during fighting between the Philippine Army and the Moro National Liberation Front his apartment was bombed by warplanes.

In February 2014, while in the Philippines, he married another convert to Islam, Joan Montayre, a 32 year old designer, and moved to an apartment in the Cebu province.

An April 2014 report by the International Centre for the Study of Radicalization at King's College London, identified Cerantonio as one of the two most popular and influential clerics urging Muslims to immigrate to the Islamic State and wage jihad.

Cerantonio's Facebook account in support of Islamic State had 12,000 followers when it was shut down in May 2014.

He started his connection with ISIS translating its speeches and official documents into English around June 2014.

In mid-2014, Islamic State and Abu Bakr Al-Baghdadi's declared the group had formed a new caliphate with Al-Baghdadi as the new Caliph, and commanded all Muslims to pledge allegiance to Al-Baghdadi and "make haste" to Syria to fight or help the jihad. While "ecstatic" over the announcement and urging his followers to obey the caliphate, (to the amusement of his critics), Cerantonio neither publicly pledged allegiance to Al-Baghdadi nor traveled to Syria. Publicly swearing allegiance to Al-Baghdadi was a violation of Australian law (Cerantonio agrees it is compulsory for Muslims to swear allegiance to someone who meets the qualifications for a caliph, and that Al-Baghdadi meets those qualifications, but will not say if he has sworn allegiance to him); and according to Cerantonio, he and his wife had difficulty immigrating.
In June 2014, on a Facebook post in Cerantonio's account indicated he had arrived in Syria. Cerantonio says the tweet was posted to throw the police off the search, and technically he had not lied to his followers because another person posted the claim. Australia’s Foreign Affairs Minister Julie Bishop denounced Cerantonio as a fraud stating, “He said he was fighting in Syria and Iraq, but he was holed up in the Philippines.”

Despite his efforts to stay offline and off the phone, in July 2014 Cerantonio was arrested in the central Philippines city of Lapu-Lapu for overstaying his visa and deported to Australia. Cerantonio claims he was denied access to a lawyer by Warden L’rev J. Del Cruz. "The warden was telling inmates not to talk to me because I was a terrorist,” he says. After two weeks in detention he was deported to Melbourne.

In September 2014, an open letter, known as the Letter to Baghdadi, addressed to Abu Bakr al-Baghdadi, the leader of the Islamic State of Iraq and Syria, was published. A theological refutation of the practices and ideology of the Islamic State of Iraq and Syria, it was signed by dozens of Islamic scholars.
Cerantonio condemned it as a "letter of ignorance and disbelief".

Australia May 2016 arrest - 'Tinnie plot' 
In 2016, acting detective Sgt Adam Foley said that according to worldwide intelligence services Cerantonio was the second or third most influential jihadist preacher in the world.

In May 2016, Cerantonio was arrested in the Queensland (along with four others) as the "ringleader" of a plot to flee the country in a boat, and for "making preparations for incursions into foreign countries to engage in hostile activities." The group planned to sail 3500 km to the southern Philippines, "overthrow" the provincial government and "install Sharia Law". The members of the group planned to sail because they could not fly; they had had their passports cancelled "due to concerns they would become foreign fighters".

After his arrest Cerantonio was remanded in custody, with the trial delayed and expected in January 2018. The other four arrested were Paul Dacre, Anthony (Antonio) Granata, Kadir Kaya, and Shayden Thorne. Thorne is the brother of controversial Islamic preacher Junaid Thorne. A sixth man, Murat Kaya, brother of Kadir Kaya, was arrested separately at his Melbourne home. Police alleged that the group towed a seven-metre boat 3100 km from Melbourne, and had planned to travel by sea on it to West Papua, the Philippines, (despite having no sailing experience) and finally to Syria, intending to join Islamic State. Later it was found they actually intended to stay in the southern Philippines to help militant Muslims overthrow the government there.

Journalist Graeme Wood mused
I tried to envision the improbable scene of five hairy mujahideen desperate not to look suspicious while hauling a deep sea fishing boat across the Outback. Did they want to get caught? After all they can now say they did what they could to reach the caliphate. And they will probably never have to leave Australia.

All those involved in the plot pled guilty and received prison sentences in February 2019. Thorne was sentenced to three years and ten months, but by then he had already served most of his minimum time. Dacre, Granata, and Kadir Kaya were each sentenced to four years in prison, three years non-parole period. Murat Kaya was sentenced to three years and eight months, two years and nine months non-parole.

Criminal conviction
In May 2019, Cerantonio was sentenced to seven years in prison for his part in the 2016 plot.
 For his defense, his lawyer, Jarrod Williams, said that Musa "doesn’t always fit the profile of an Islamic extremist", as he enjoys music by the likes of AC/DC, Cold Chisel, Johnny Cash, Paul Simon and Rammstein.

Release 
Murat Kaya was released under a control order in late January 2020, and Shayden Thorne in early March 2020 under an interim control order.
In September 2021, the Murdoch-owned Herald Sun reported Cerantonio would soon be released from imprisonment but would be kept under surveillance. A month later, the same news source reported that Cerantonio had claimed to renounce his past activities.

References

Bibliography
 

Australian Muslim activists
Australian Islamists
Australian propagandists
Living people
1986 births
Islamic State of Iraq and the Levant propagandists
Activists from Melbourne
Australian people of Italian descent
Australian people of Irish descent
Former Muslims turned agnostics or atheists
Former Muslim critics of Islam
Australian former Muslims
People from Footscray, Victoria